Joseph Lonchampt  (1825–1890) was a French stockbroker and positivist writer.

Lonchampt had a religious view of positivism, composing a series of prayers dedicated to the "New great Being" i.e. "Humanity". He claimed that prayer or meditation as a mental exercise would ensure success and constituted a useful instrument to realise both personal and social improvement.

In 1859 he was appointed professor of Popular Astronomy at the Association Polytechnique pour le développement de l'instruction publique.

Works
 Essai sur la prière (1852) Lyon: C. Savy (English translation Positivist Prayer (1877) trans John G. Mills)

References

1825 births
1890 deaths
Positivists
French writers
French stockbrokers